Ellen Sarah Kettle MBE (c. 21 April 1922 – 2 August 1999) was an Australian nurse and midwife who pioneered mobile health care in isolated areas of the Northern Territory of Australia.

Early life

Ellen was born in Colac to Thomas and Mary Kettle (nee Bicket) and was one of five children. Her schooling commenced  in the local small country school and her secondary education was at Colac High School where she traveled to by horse eight miles each way.  After completing her general nursing at Geelong Hospital in 1945 and her midwifery training at Townsville Hospital in 1951, she spent six months on Thursday Island, providing health care to Aboriginal and Torres Strait Islander people.  This prompted her to write to the Director of Health in Canberra to enquire about the opportunity to work in the Northern Territory.

Work in the Northern Territory

Kettle commenced nursing on the Aboriginal settlement of Yuendumu about from 300 kilometers from Alice Springs on 2 February 1952, where she was known as Nurse Kettle. She was the first permanent sister to be sent there by the Native Affairs Branch of the Northern Territory. Ellen describes her surroundings after commencing  at the Yuendumu Clinic as “there were about 400 desert people, few of whom knew any English and I didn’t their language.  Both the hospital and my living quarters were of unlined wartime camouflaged iron with no electricity or reticulated water”. In 1954, Ellen was appointed the Commonwealth Department of Health’s first Rural Survey Sister pioneering mobile health work in isolated areas throughout the Northern Territory, visiting all church missions, Government settlements and large cattle stations.  This saw the commencement of a register of Aboriginal births and deaths.

Over the next five decades, she almost single-handedly revolutionised Aboriginal health care in the Northern Territory by documenting the health status of Indigenous communities and attempting to draw attention to the plight of Aboriginal health, particularly in regard to the high infant mortality rates.

In 1958, she began work on introducing standardised records and weight graphs for infants under five years of age.  This data was used to publish a weight and height curve for Aboriginal children in 1966.

Kettle won the $5000 H. J. Heinz nursing scholarship in 1966 to support her to study in Africa and India. She worked as the matron in charge of nursing at Department of Health in Port Moresby in Papua New Guinea in 1969.

She was made a Member of the Order of the British Empire (MBE) for her services to nursing in 1967.

She died in Darwin on 2 August 1999 at the age of 77.

Publications
 1967 – Gone Bush
 1967 – Child health in newly developing countries
 1968 – Development of rural health services in the northern territory
 1979 – That They Might Live
 1986 - A brief history of Royal Darwin Hospital
 1991 – Health services in the Northern Territory: a history 1824–1970

References

External links
 Manuscript collection at the Northern Territory Library

1922 births
1999 deaths
People from Colac, Victoria
Australian nurses
Australian Members of the Order of the British Empire